Putkaqucha (Quechua putka muddy (Jauja Quechua), qucha lake, "muddy lake", hispanicized spelling Putcacocha) is a mountain in Peru, about  high, at a lake of that name. The mountain and the lake are located in the Junín Region, Concepción Province, Andamarca District, northeast of the Waytapallana mountain range. The peak of Putkaqucha is south of Utkhu Warqu.

References

Mountains of Peru
Mountains of Junín Region
Lakes of Peru
Lakes of Junín Region